George Trevelyan may refer to:

 Sir George Trevelyan, 2nd Baronet (1838–1928), British statesman and author
 G. M. Trevelyan (George Macaulay Trevelyan, 1876–1962), historian, son of the above
 Sir George Trevelyan, 4th Baronet (1906–1996), British educational pioneer
 George Trevelyan (priest) (1865–1827), Anglican priest

See also
 Trevelyan baronets